Patiño or Patino is a surname of Hispanic origin. The name refers to:

From Bolivia
Simón Iturri Patiño (1862–1947), Bolivian tycoon (industrialist and mine owner) ranked among the five richest men in the world
Antenor Patiño (1896–1982), Bolivian tycoon, heir to Simón Iturri Patiño
Beatriz Canedo Patiño (contemporary), Bolivian fashion designer
Azul Patiño (contemporary), wife of Mario Patiño (Simón Iturri Patiño's nephew and Antenor Patiño's cousin) and mother of the famous war journalist Juan Carlos Gumucio
 Jaime Ortiz-Patiño (1930–2013), Bolivian art collector, golf course owner and former President of the World Bridge Federation.

Others
Alejandro Patino (contemporary), American television actor
Basilio Martín Patino (1930–2017), Spanish film director
Éder Patiño (born 1984), Mexican soccer player
Elisa Patiño Meléndez (1890–1919), the first women of Galician descent to become a pilot
Hernán Patiño (1966–1995), Colombian road cyclist
Jairo Patiño (born 1978), Colombian professional football player
Javier Patiño (born 1988), Filipino professional footballer
José Patiño (1666–1736), Spanish statesman
Luis Patiño (born 1999), Colombian professional baseball player
Luis Patiño (born 1993), Mexican professional tennis player
Maria José Martínez-Patiño (born 1961), Spanish intersex hurdler at the 1985 World University Games
María Patiño (born 1971), Spanish journalist and presenter
Odin Patiño (born 1983), Mexican professional football player
Rosalba Patiño (born 1960), Colombian chess master
Victor Patiño-Fomeque (born 1959), Colombian narcotics trafficker with the Cali cartel
Charlie Patino (born 2003), English association footballer with Spanish heritage

See also
Pitino, surname

References